Brevoxathres is a genus of beetles in the family Cerambycidae, containing the following species:

 Brevoxathres albobrunneus (Gilmour, 1962)
 Brevoxathres fasciata Gilmour, 1959
 Brevoxathres irrorata Monne, 2007
 Brevoxathres seabrai Monne, 2007
 Brevoxathres x-littera (Melzer, 1932)

References

Acanthocinini